The Vermont City Marathon (VCM) is an annual marathon in the city of Burlington, Vermont, in the United States, first held on May 28, 1989.  The race is generally held on the Sunday of Memorial Day weekend, and attracts people from the New England area.  It is produced by RunVermont, a not-for-profit organization.

History
The race was first held in 1989.

The race record for men, set by Michael Khobotov in 2001, is 2:17:03. The women's record is held by three-time champion Heidi Westerling, who ran 2:35:02 in 2009.

In 2010, there were 2737 marathon finishers, 690 two-person teams and 706 three-to-five person teams.

The VCM was the first marathon to incorporate relay teams which consists of 5 members.

The 2020 in-person edition of the race was cancelled due to the coronavirus pandemic, with all marathon registrants given the option of running the race virtually or transferring their entry to 2021 or 2022.

Hall of Fame 

There has been a long-standing disagreement between the race's Board of Directors and one of the runners. In 1998, for the race's 10th Anniversary, a club called the "Hall of Fame" was formed to honor runners who had been a part of the event each year. Membership is a mix of those who have completed every marathon, some who have started but not finished all years, some who have run on a relay team in various years, and still others who for various reasons registered for all of the VCM races but did not start some of the races. The disagreeing runner wore a cone shaped hat proclaiming "Hall of Farce" as he ran the race, reflecting his belief that the Hall of Fame should honor only those who had finished every race. This runner's streak of 19 consecutive KBVCM finishes ended in 2008 when he did not pick up his bib, show up at the starting line, or make any public statements about the race.

In 2008 the race's Hall of Fame was renamed the RunVermont Hall of Fame and membership was expanded to include individuals who have been instrumental in the success of the race over the years such as the original Race Director, Gordon MacFarland and long-standing volunteers such as Don and Betty Lacharite. The RunVermont Hall of Fame also includes the 13 runners who completed the full  for the first 19 editions of the KeyBank Vermont City Marathon.

Course 
The USATF certified course has remained the same since 2001. It starts in Battery Park  overlooking Lake Champlain, does a  loop through downtown Burlington, then heads out the Burlington Beltline (VT 127), a highway that is closed to traffic only once a year for the marathon. The course then climbs back into downtown Burlington before heading south and joining the Burlington bikepath at Oakledge Park, where the halfway point is reached. The course follows the bikepath north to the "Assault on Battery Hill", the largest climb on the course. After going through Battery Park at mile 15.1, the course does a final loop through residential neighborhoods in the north side of Burlington, then follows the bikepath back to the finish at Waterfront Park beside Lake Champlain

Other races 
Runners in the Vermont City Marathon can compete in the full marathon, on a two-person relay team running half marathons, or on a three-to-five person relay team running legs ranging from 3.1 to 6.2 miles. Due to overwhelming demand in the relay events, relay team spots are available only through a lottery while spots for the full marathon can be acquired through the standard entry process.

Community impact 

The race is produced by RunVermont, a not-for-profit organization committed to promoting running in Vermont. RunVermont also organizes several other races including First Run Burlington and the Half Marathon Unplugged, as well as adult training programs, and a youth running and health education program called Many Milers.

Winners

Men's

Women's

By nationality 

 Sources:

Notes

References

External links 

 
Map of Course 
How to Crack the Vermont City Marathon

Recurring sporting events established in 1988
Marathons in the United States
Sports in Burlington, Vermont
Tourist attractions in Burlington, Vermont